The Tour of Japan is an annual professional road bicycle racing stage race held in Japan since 1996 as part of the UCI Asia Tour. It is sanctioned by the International Cycling Union (UCI) as a 2.1 category race.

History
Tour of Japan was formed as the successor of the Kokusai Cycle Road Race which began in 1982.  In 1996, Tour of Japan began as a UCI category 2-5 stage race, and became category 2–4 in 1997.  It was downgraded to category 2–5 in 2002.

As the UCI race system was reformed in 2005, it was included in the UCI Asia Tour as a category 2.2 event. It became a category 2.1 event in 2013.

The race has only been cancelled three times in its history. The 2003 edition was canceled for concern over the 2002–2004 SARS outbreak, and the 2011 edition was canceled because of the 2011 Tōhoku earthquake and tsunami. The 2020 edition was canceled due to the COVID-19 pandemic.

The 2021 edition was held as a class 2.2 event and a three-day stage race with all domestic teams, exempted by the UCI from the mandatory invitation of foreign teams under Japan's international travel restrictions.  The 2022 edition was held as a four-stages, class 2.2 event.

Past winners

General classification

Notes

External links

 
 
 Statistics at the-sports.org
 Tour of Japan at cqranking.com

Cycle races in Japan
UCI Asia Tour races
Recurring sporting events established in 1996
1996 establishments in Japan